Axel Marie Gustave Hervelle (born 12 May 1983) is a Belgian former professional basketball player. He represented the senior Belgian national basketball team.

Professional career
Hervelle spent the early part of his career in Belgium. He first played with Verviers-Pepinster in the Belgian League for four years, averaging 11.4 points and 10.6 rebounds per game, in 16 Belgian League games during the 2003–04 season, and becoming the team's captain at only 20 years old. He then signed with the Spanish ACB League club Real Madrid. In the 200506 season, he averaged 24 minutes, 8.5 points, and 5.5 rebounds per game, over 32 games played in the Spanish League. In January 2010, Hervelle signed with Bilbao.

On 3 August 2018, Hervelle signed a one-year contract with Spirou of the Belgian League.

On 30 November 2020, Hervelle announced his retirement.

NBA draft rights
Hervelle was drafted by the Denver Nuggets, in the second round (52nd pick overall) of the 2005 NBA draft. He became the first Belgian player ever to be drafted by an NBA team. In 2009, his NBA draft rights were traded to the Houston Rockets, in exchange for James White. On 27 November 2020, Hervelle's draft rights were traded to the New York Knicks.

National team career
Hervelle has been a member of the senior Belgian national basketball team. He represented Belgium at the EuroBasket 2015, where they lost to Greece, in the tournament's eighth finals, by a score of 75–54.

Career statistics

Domestic leagues

Achievements
 2× Liga ACB champion: (2004–05, 2006–07)
 EuroCup champion: (2006–07)

References

External links
 FIBA Archive Profile
 Eurobasket.com Profile
 Euroleague.net Profile
 Spanish League Profile 
 Draftexpress.com Profile

1983 births
Living people
Belgian expatriate basketball people in Spain
Belgian men's basketball players
Belgium national basketball players
Bilbao Basket players
Denver Nuggets draft picks
Liga ACB players
Power forwards (basketball)
RBC Pepinster players
Real Madrid Baloncesto players
Small forwards
Spirou Charleroi players
Sportspeople from Liège